Athletics at the 2014 South American Games took place between March 13–16, 2014.  The event was held at the Estadio Nacional Julio Martínez Prádanos in Santiago, Chile.  A total of 44 events were contested, 22 by men and 22 by women.  Detailed reports were given by Eduardo Biscayart for the IAAF.  A total of 29 games records (GR), (at least) 7 national records (NR), and 11 world leading marks (best mark worldwide in the current season, WL) were set.

The 2014 athletics competition marked the return of senior athletes to the competition, removing the age limits that had been introduced in 2002 (under-20s) and continued at the 2006 and 2010 games (under-23s). This coincided with increased attendance levels, including many of the region's top level athletes. This raised the calibre of the competition to an elite South American event, which paralleled the status of other continental multi-sport events, such as the Asian Games and All-Africa Games.

Men's discus thrower Rodolfo Casanova of Uruguay gave the sole positive doping test in the athletics events and he was banned for two years.

Medal summary

Medal winners were published.

Men

Women

Medal table
The medal count was published.

Team scores
Team scores were published.

Participation
Participation of 317 athletes (172 men, 145 women) from 14 countries was reported.

 (27)
 (1)
 (10)
 (63)
 (65)
 (39)
 (23)
 (5)
 (8)
 (6)
 (11)
 (5)
 (7)
 (32)

References

External links
Official webpage
Results

 
2014
2014 South American Games
South American Games
South American Games
2014 South American Games events